Haymarket Square is a commercial area on the Near West Side of Chicago at Randolph Street and Des Plaines Street just east of Halsted Street, known primarily for the protest and bombing that occurred on May 4, 1886. It was a wide, busy commercial food produce market for much of the 19th and early 20th centuries. The square is a tourist destination, and is often a rally point for various unions and political groups and individuals.

References

Geography of Chicago
Streets in Chicago